Major Aubrey Leland Oakes Buxton, Baron Buxton of Alsa  (15 July 1918 – 1 September 2009) was a British soldier, politician, television executive, and writer.

Biography

Early life
He was born on 15 July 1918. His father was Leland William Wilberforce Buxton and his mother, Ada Mary Oakes. He was the great-great-grandson of the anti-slavery campaigner Sir Thomas Buxton. He was educated at Ampleforth College in Yorkshire and graduated from Trinity College, Cambridge. He served in the Royal Artillery in the Second World War and was decorated with the Military Cross in 1943.

Career
From 1958 to 1988, he was a Director of Anglia Television. He was best known for creating the nature documentary series Survival, which ran for four decades.

Philanthropy
In 1961, he was one of the co-founders of the World Wildlife Fund. As well as the WWF, he was involved with the Natural History Museum, the Wildfowl and Wetlands Trust and the London Zoological Society. 

In 1976, he and Lady Buxton donated a 10 hectare estate near Elsenham to the Essex Wildlife Trust, and it is named the Aubrey Buxton Nature Reserve.

In 1964, he was Extra Equerry to Prince Philip, Duke of Edinburgh and in 1972 High Sheriff of Essex. He became Deputy Lieutenant of Essex in 1975 and held this office until 1985.

Peerage
On 11 May 1978, he was created a life peer as Baron Buxton of Alsa, of Stiffkey in the County of Norfolk. In 1996, Buxton, was invested as a Knight Commander of the Royal Victorian Order (KCVO).

Personal life
He was married twice: firstly to Pamela Mary "Maria" Birkin, daughter of Sir Henry Birkin, 3rd Baronet, on 14 November 1946; and secondly (having been widowed in 1983) to Mrs. Kathleen Peterson, an American  on 16 July 1988. His first marriage produced six children, one of whom, Cindy, is a noted filmmaker.

Death
He died on 1 September 2009, aged 91, from undisclosed causes.

See also
Survival (TV series)

Bibliography
The Birds of Arakan (1946)
The King in his Country (1955)
The London Scene (1961)

References

External links
 

1918 births
2009 deaths
Conservative Party (UK) life peers
Deputy Lieutenants of Essex
Knights Commander of the Royal Victorian Order
Recipients of the Military Cross
Royal Artillery officers
British Army personnel of World War II
British conservationists
English television executives
Equerries
High Sheriffs of Essex
Alumni of Trinity College, Cambridge
People educated at Ampleforth College
Aubrey
People from Stiffkey
20th-century English businesspeople
Life peers created by Elizabeth II
Place of birth missing